JMS may refer to:

Buildings 
 EverBank Field, formerly known as Jacksonville Municipal Stadium, a sports stadium in Jacksonville, Florida
 Johannesburg Muslim School, a private school in Johannesburg, South Africa
 John Mason School, a secondary school in Abingdon, Oxfordshire

Computing 
 Japanese MapleStory, a version of the Korean game, Maplestory
 Java Message Service, a Java message-oriented middleware application programming interface for sending messages between two or more clients
 Java Module System, a Java specification for collections of Java code and related resources

People 
 J. Michael Straczynski (born 1954), contemporary fiction and television writer
 Jamie McLeod-Skinner (born 1967), American politician
 John Maynard Smith (1920–2004), geneticist and evolutionary theorist
 John Michael Stipe, known as Michael Stipe (born 1960), lead singer of the band R.E.M.
 Jung Myung Seok (born 1945), leader of Providence religious movement

Publications 
 Journal of Management Studies, Management studies journal
 Journal of Mass Spectrometry, a scientific journal dedicated to mass spectrometry
 Journal of Materials Science, materials science journal
 The Journal of Men's Studies, social studies journal

Others 
 Jesus Morning Star, also known as Providence, a religious movement founded by Jung Myung Seok
 Jamestown Regional Airport, North Dakota, U.S.